UFC 215: Nunes vs. Shevchenko 2 was a mixed martial arts event produced by the Ultimate Fighting Championship held on September 9, 2017 at Rogers Place in Edmonton, Alberta, Canada.

Background
The promotion was initially planning a PPV event for August 19 at a venue to be in announced in the United States (presumably Seattle), possibly with UFC Flyweight Champion and Seattle-area resident Demetrious Johnson. However, those plans were nixed on June 26, though an exact reason wasn’t given. Therefore, an originally scheduled UFC 216 to be held at Rogers Place in Edmonton, Alberta, Canada on September 9 was renamed as UFC 215.

While the UFC has hosted many events across Canada, the event was the first held in Edmonton (second in Alberta, after UFC 149 in 2012). Zuffa hosted a World Extreme Cagefighting event, WEC 49, at Rexall Place in Edmonton in June 2010.

A UFC Flyweight Championship bout between current champion Demetrious Johnson and Ray Borg was expected to serve as the event headliner. If successful in his title defense, Johnson would have become the UFC fighter with most title defenses of all time, with a total of eleven. In turn, the fight was canceled a day before the event, as Borg was forced to withdraw from the fight on Thursday evening due to illness. According to multiple sources, Borg was battling an illness and was deemed unfit to fight by UFC doctors. His illness was unrelated to his weight cut, sources say.  The fight was later rescheduled for UFC 216 the following month.

A UFC Women's Bantamweight Championship bout between current champion Amanda Nunes and multiple-time muay thai world champion Valentina Shevchenko took place at this event. The pairing met previously in March 2016 at UFC 196, with Nunes winning by unanimous decision. The pairing was initially expected to meet again at UFC 213. However, the bout was canceled just hours before the event started as Nunes pulled out, citing an illness despite being medically cleared to fight. Due to the cancelation of the Johnson-Borg bout, this fight acted as the new main event.

A women's bantamweight bout between Sara McMann and Ketlen Vieira was expected to take place at UFC 214, but on July 7 it was announced that the bout was moved to this event.

Former UFC Heavyweight Champion Junior dos Santos was expected to face Francis Ngannou, but on August 18 it was announced that he was pulled from the card after being notified by USADA of a potential doping violation. He was flagged after an out-of-competition drug test conducted August 10. Dos Santos tested positive for hydrochlorothiazide and his team is currently working on testing supplements as a possible source for it. In turn, Ngannou was removed from the card after promotion officials deemed that a suitable opponent could not be arranged.

Results

Bonus awards
The following fighters were awarded $50,000 bonuses:
Fight of the Night: Jeremy Stephens  vs. Gilbert Melendez 
Performance of the Night: Rafael dos Anjos and Henry Cejudo

See also
List of UFC events
2017 in UFC

References

Ultimate Fighting Championship events
Events in Edmonton
2017 in mixed martial arts
Mixed martial arts in Canada
Sport in Edmonton
September 2017 sports events in Canada